Head Against the Sky E.P. is an EP of the band Eisley released October 25, 2005 on Reprise Records. The title song was recorded in Seattle, WA and was the last song recorded with the original bass player Jonathan Wilson. The song was fan revived after the band received several requests to play it live. It originally appeared on EP2 and is a non-album track.

Track listing

2005 EPs
Eisley albums